The Margara Golf Open was a golf tournament on the Challenge Tour. It was played annually from 1982 to 2001 at Golf Club Margara in Fubine, Italy.

Winners

References

External links
Coverage on the Challenge Tour's official site
Golf Club Margara

Former Challenge Tour events
Golf tournaments in Italy